Keith O'Neal Jennings (born May 19, 1966) is a former American football tight end in the National Football League (NFL) for the Dallas Cowboys and Chicago Bears. He also was a member of the Las Vegas Outlaws in the XFL. He played college football at Clemson University.

Early years
Jennings attended Summerville High School, where he was a high school All-American and an All-State wide receiver, while helping his team win 3 Division I-AAAA state championships. He posted 85 receptions for 1,760 yards (20.7 avg.) and 17 touchdowns in his final two seasons.

He also was an All-state first baseman, contributing to the school winning 2 state titles.

College career
Jennings accepted a football scholarship from Clemson University. As a freshman, he was a backup wide receiver and his best game came in the 1985 Independence Bowl against the University of Minnesota, where he had 3 receptions for 41 yards, including his first career touchdown.

He became a starter as a junior and was considered at the time the biggest wide receiver in school history. Playing in run-oriented offenses, he excelled at blocking, after the game against the University of Maryland head coach Danny Ford said "Keith is the best blocking wide receiver I've ever seen". He was second on the team with 31 receptions and 475 receiving yards. His best regular season game came against North Carolina State University, when he had 6 receptions for 84 yards. In the 1988 Florida Citrus Bowl, he posted 7 receptions for a school-bowl record 110 yards against Penn State University. The 7 receptions were the most by a Tiger player since 1981.

As a senior, he led the team with 30 receptions and 397 receiving yards, while also collecting one receiving touchdown. He helped the Tigers win a third straight Atlantic Coast Conference championship.

He finished his career with 78 receptions (eighth in school history) for 1,117 yards (ninth in school history) and 2 touchdowns. During his time in college, his teams had a 34-12-2 record and appeared in 4 bowl games.

Professional career

Dallas Cowboys
Jennings was selected by the Dallas Cowboys in the fifth round (113th overall) of the 1989 NFL Draft, with the intention of converting him into a tight end, even though he didn't have any previous experience at that position. He was released on September 4 and signed to the team's practice squad. 

He was promoted to the active roster before the seventh game and went on to appear in 10 games. He played mainly on special teams and as a second tight end in short yardage situations. Against the Green Bay Packers he had 4 receptions for 37 yards. He was waived injured on September 2, 1990.

Montreal Machine (WLAF)
In 1991, he signed with the Montreal Machine of the World League of American Football. He was a backup tight end behind K. D. Dunn, tallying 4 receptions for 54 yards and one touchdown.

Denver Broncos
On July 3, 1991, he was signed as a free agent by the Denver Broncos. He was released on August 26, 1991.

Chicago Bears
On October 9, 1991, Jennings was signed as a free agent to replace Cap Boso who had suffered a career-ending knee injury. In 1992, he developed into a blocking tight end and was named the starter in place of James Thornton, who was placed on the injured reserve list on September 1.

He was released on August 28, 1994. On October 24, he was re-signed after starter Chris Gedney was lost for the season.

In 1995, he recorded the most touchdowns by a Bears tight end (6) since Mike Ditka's finished with 8 in 1963. The following season, he was placed on the injured reserve list with a broken left leg, after the sixth game of the season. He was waived injured on December 10, 1997.

Detroit Lions
On August 4, 1998, he signed with the Detroit Lions, before being waived on August 30.

Las Vegas Outlaws (XFL)
On January 9, 2001, he was signed by the Las Vegas Outlaws of the XFL. He served as a third-string tight end behind Rickey Brady and didn't record any stat. The league ceased operations in May 2001.

Personal life
His older brother Stanford Jennings played running back for the Cincinnati Bengals of the National Football League. His cousin Antonio Anderson played defensive tackle in the National Football League. 

In 2017, Jennings was an undergraduate tight ends coach under Dabo Swinney at Clemson University. In 2017, he served as a scouting intern with the Buffalo Bills during training camp and preseason under the NFL Nunn-Wooten Scouting Fellowship. On June 11, 2018, he was hired as the Buffalo Bills BLESTO college scout.

References

External links
Jennings Tightens His Lease With Bears
Bear Tight Ends' Assignment: Be Toughest Kids On The Blocks

1966 births
Living people
People from Summerville, South Carolina
Players of American football from South Carolina
American football tight ends
Clemson Tigers football players
Dallas Cowboys players
Chicago Bears players
Montreal Machine players
Las Vegas Outlaws (XFL) players
Buffalo Bills scouts